Georg Philip Hertzberg Krog (2 July 1915 – 3 August 1991) was a Norwegian Olympic speed skater and lawyer.

Early life
Krog was born in Bergen, and was a great-grandson of Hans Jensen Krog.

Career
He received a silver medal at the 1936 Winter Olympics in Garmisch-Partenkirchen. It was later noted that gold medallist Ivar Ballangrud probably was clocked in a second too early, something which could have cost Krog the gold medal. At the 1937 World Allround Speed Skating Championships Krog won the 500 m distance in 42.9 seconds.

He represented the clubs Drammens SK, Gimsøy IF and Oslo SK. He chaired the Norwegian Skating Association from 1961 to 1965. After his speed skating career he worked as a barrister.

References

1915 births
1991 deaths
Norwegian male speed skaters
Olympic speed skaters of Norway
Speed skaters at the 1936 Winter Olympics
Olympic silver medalists for Norway
Norwegian sports executives and administrators
Sportspeople from Drammen
Olympic medalists in speed skating
Medalists at the 1936 Winter Olympics
20th-century Norwegian lawyers